The Liber di Tre Scricciur ("Book of the Three Scriptures") is an epic poem by Bonvesin da la Riva (1240-c.1313) written in the Lombard language. The poem is an imaginative vision of the afterlife, heaven and hell, and the passion of Christ. It is composed of quatrains with only one rhyme.

See also 
Divine Comedy

References

External links 
 Full text on Wikisource

Epic poems